Valentina Sassi (born 12 July 1980) is an Italian tennis coach and an instructor of the United States Professional Tennis Association (USPTA). She is a former professional tennis player and a doubles bronze medalist for Italy at the 2001 Mediterranean Games.

Born in Seravezza, Sassi made her WTA Tour main-draw debut at the Madrid Open in 2001, as a qualifier. In 2002, she reached her best singles ranking of 144, making main-draw appearances at Oporto and Casablanca that year. Sassi, a right-handed player, won six singles and seven doubles titles on the ITF Women's Circuit, before retiring in 2008.

Career
Sassi started playing tennis when she was six years old before developing into a professional tennis player. She made her WTA Tour debut at the Madrid Open in 2000, and competed in the majors of Roland Garros, Wimbledon and Australian Open, and the Internazionali di tennis in Rome. In 2004, she won the Italian Absolute Championships. At the peak of her career, Sassi played in doubles with players such as Jelena Janković, Kim Clijsters, Miroslava Vavrinec, Jelena Dokic and Daniela Hantuchová. She played 488 games with 60 per cent winning rate before quitting in 2006.

Coaching
Sassi moved to the United States in 2008 and started coaching tennis. Later, she joined Rick Macci tennis academy where she was involved in coaching players such as Maria Sharapova, Jennifer Capriati and Andy Roddick. In May 2020, Sassi earned the title of International Professional Tennis Coach as Instructor of the Italian Tennis Federation USPTA, the highest level instructor of young tennis players.

ITF Circuit finals

Singles: 10 (6–4)

Doubles: 17 (7–10)

References

External links
 
 

1980 births
Living people
Italian female tennis players
Mediterranean Games medalists in tennis
Mediterranean Games bronze medalists for Italy
Competitors at the 2001 Mediterranean Games
Italian tennis coaches
Tennis coaches
American tennis coaches